Mathew Antony "Matty" Stevens (born 12 February 1998) is an English footballer and former amateur boxer. He plays as a forward for League Two club Walsall  on loan from League One club Forest Green Rovers.

Boxing career
Stevens was born into a boxing family – grandfather Les Stevens was a professional boxer who fought John Conteh in 1974. Stevens, who fought out of Pinewood Starr ABC in Crowthorne and once sparred with Tim Witherspoon, won four national titles during his brief career at youth level. In 2011, he won the ABAE Schools national title and the GB Schoolboy 3 Nations title, repeating the feat again in 2012. Stevens was undefeated during his boxing career.

Football career

Barnet
Stevens quit boxing aged 15, although while still fighting he was part of the youth teams at Aldershot Town, Farnborough, and Reading, where he scored 32 goals in the 2013–14 season at U-16 level. Stevens joined Barnet in the summer of 2014 on a two-year scholarship. Impressive goal scoring form for the youth team early in the season saw him make his senior debut against Alfreton Town on 6 September 2014, coming on as a substitute for Sam Togwell after 82 minutes, becoming Barnet's youngest ever player aged 16 years and 204 days, a record previously held by Mauro Vilhete (a record lost to Dwight Pascal in 2016). His first senior goal for the Bees came in the Herts Senior Cup against St. Margaretsbury on 26 November 2014. The following month he scored again in the FA Trophy against Concord Rangers on 16 December 2014 – scoring a Panenka penalty – and also becoming Barnet's youngest ever goalscorer in a national competition. Stevens scored 57 goals in all competitions (including youth games) in the 2014–15 season – attracting interest from larger clubs, including Swansea City, who had a £250,000 offer for Stevens rejected in May 2015. A bid was also received from Crystal Palace with both Manchester United and Manchester City sending scouts to watch him play.

Stevens scored six times for the Bees in 2015–16 pre-season, and made his Football League debut when he came on as an 87th-minute substitute for Michael Gash against Leyton Orient on 8 August 2015. Barnet transfer listed Stevens in January 2016 after he turned down two contract offers from the club. Stevens scored his first league goal for the Bees against AFC Wimbledon on 20 January 2016.

Peterborough United
Stevens signed for Peterborough United on 1 July 2016, signing a three-year deal.

Stevens joined Cambridge City on loan in December 2016, before joining Sligo Rovers on loan on 14 January 2017. He scored three goals in twelve appearances for Sligo. Stevens joined Kettering Town on loan in August 2017 until the rest of the season, and finished as top scorer with 25 league goals. Stevens also finished as top scorer for Posh in 2018–19 pre-season before joinining Slough Town on loan on 31 August 2018 until the New Year, but was recalled in early December.

He was transfer-listed by Peterborough United at the end of the 2018–19 season.

Forest Green Rovers
Stevens joined Forest Green Rovers on a three-year deal for an undisclosed fee in July 2019. He scored his first goals for Forest Green when he scored twice in an EFL Trophy tie against Southampton U21 on 3 September 2019. On 5 January 2021, Stevens joined Stevenage on loan until the end of the season.

After an impressive start to the 2021–22 season that saw Stevens score five goals in the opening five matches of the season, he was awarded the league's Player of the Month award for August 2021 with manager Rob Edwards scooping the Manager of the Month award. Stevens went on to score 27 goals in the 2021-22 season. 

On 31 January 2023, Stevens joined Walsall on loan until the end of the season.

Career statistics

Honours
Forest Green Rovers
League Two: 2021–22

Individual
PFA Team of the Year: 2021–22 League Two
EFL League Two Player of the Month: August 2021

References

External links

Matt Stevens profile at 11v11

 

1998 births
Living people
English male boxers
English footballers
Association football forwards
Aldershot Town F.C. players
Farnborough F.C. players
Reading F.C. players
Barnet F.C. players
Peterborough United F.C. players
Cambridge City F.C. players
Sligo Rovers F.C. players
Kettering Town F.C. players
Slough Town F.C. players
Forest Green Rovers F.C. players
Stevenage F.C. players
Walsall F.C. players
English Football League players
League of Ireland players
National League (English football) players
Southern Football League players
English expatriate footballers
Expatriate association footballers in the Republic of Ireland
People from Surrey
Footballers from Surrey